VA-172 was an Attack Squadron of the U.S. Navy. It was established as Bomber Fighter Squadron VBF-82 on 20 August 1945, redesignated as Fighter Squadron VF-18A on 15 November 1946, as VF-172 on 11 August 1948, and as VA-172 on 1 November 1955. The squadron was disestablished on 15 January 1971. Its nickname was the Checkmates from 1946-1950, and the Blue Bolts thereafter.

Operational history
28 Jan 1949: Squadron aircraft, while secured to the flight deck and engines running, were used to assist in berthing  in Augusta, Sicily. This procedure is known as Operation Pinwheel.
23 Aug 1951: The squadron participated in its first combat sortie over Korea. This also marked the first use of the F2H-2 in combat.
25 Aug 1951: The squadron’s F2H-2 aircraft, along with F9Fs from VF-51, provided escort for 30 U.S. Air Force B-29 bombers raiding the marshalling yards at Rashin, North Korea.
Nov–Dec 1956: , with VA-172 embarked, was ordered to deploy and operate off the coast of Spain as a result of the Suez crisis.
Nov 1961: VA-172, embarked on Roosevelt, operated off the coast of the Dominican Republic to support the newly established democratic government.
May 1963: Roosevelt, with VA-172 embarked, deployed to the Caribbean and operated off the coast of Haiti in response to a rebel attempt to overthrow the Haitian government.
Jul–Sep 1963: A detachment from the squadron was deployed aboard  to provide fighter coverage for the ASW Task Group during operations in the Caribbean Sea.
8–29 Aug 1964: Roosevelt, with VA-172 embarked, was ordered to operate in the vicinity of Cyprus after fighting escalated between Turkish and Greek forces on the island.
Aug 1966: The squadron commenced combat operations in Vietnam. These were its first combat sorties since the Korean War in 1952.
2 Dec 1966: The squadron’s commanding officer, Commander Bruce A. Nystrom, was lost in a night reconnaissance mission over the Red River delta area in North Vietnam.

Home port assignments
The squadron was assigned to these home ports, effective on the dates shown:
 NAS Alameda – 20 Aug 1945
 NAS Quonset Point – 15 Jan 1946
 NAAS Cecil Field – 04 Mar 1949
 NAS Jacksonville – 24 Mar 1950
 NAS Cecil Field – 22 Feb 1958

Aircraft assignment
The squadron first received the following aircraft on the dates shown:
 F6F-5 Hellcat – Aug 1945
 F4U Corsair – 06 Sep 1945
 F8F Bearcat – 1946
 FH-1 Phantom –  Mar 1949
 F2H-1 Banshee – May 1949
 F2H-2 Banshee – 21 Jun 1950
 F2H-4 Banshee – 13 Jan 1956
 F2H-2B Banshee – Sep 1956
 A4D-1 Skyhawk – 16 Dec 1957
 A4D-2 Skyhawk – May 1958
 A4C Skyhawk – 06 Sep 1961

See also
 List of squadrons in the Dictionary of American Naval Aviation Squadrons
 Attack aircraft
 List of inactive United States Navy aircraft squadrons
 History of the United States Navy

References

External links

Attack squadrons of the United States Navy
Wikipedia articles incorporating text from the Dictionary of American Naval Aviation Squadrons